Loser was an American alternative rock band which was active from 2001 to 2006.

Guitarist John 5 of Marilyn Manson fame formed Loser along with his friend and producer Bob Marlette. Marlette recommended Texas singer Joe Grah, who had already had success fronting the Texas alternative rock group Jibe, as a potential vocalist for the band. John flew to Texas to see Jibe in concert and immediately invited Grah to join. The group recruited fellow Texas musician Charles Lee Salvaggio on bass, as well as former The Feds drummer Glendon Crain. With the lineup secured, Loser began working on their debut album Just Like You. The band played its first show in Hollywood, California on June 9, 2005.

The name Loser came about as a reaction to John 5's past:

When questioned in an interview regarding the band's sound, John 5 replied, "It is just great rock music. It is kinda like the Foo Fighters, Queens of the Stone Age, new-age stuff."

The band had initial success not long after signing with Island Records, when their song "Nobody Knows" was added to active rock radio nationwide and their track "Disposable Sunshine" was included on the 2005 Fantastic Four soundtrack. During the recording of the soundtrack, however, Crain briefly left the band and was replaced by drummer Elias Andra, a friend of Salvaggio's. Andra had had some success himself with the industrial metal band Psycho Plague, his own creation, which toured with Linkin Park. However, Andra soon left after promotional shots had been taken, and Crain returned. In 2006 Loser was the opening act on Staind's Chapter V tour, along with Theory of a Deadman.

Loser was set to release its debut album, Just Like You, on May 9, 2006 on Island/Def Jam Recordings. At the same time, John 5 was also working for Rob Zombie, and a conflict arose. As Zombie was also touring, John 5 tried to find a live replacement for himself while Loser was touring on conflicting dates. With promo material for the debut album already out and a release date in the bag, Island Records decided it didn't like the idea of Loser without John 5, and dropped the band from the label.

"Being the founding member of Loser, my decision to leave was not an easy one", said John 5 in a press release. "I've been juggling two careers, both with Loser and Rob Zombie, for over one year now. I found it impossible to be in two places at once."

Since the dissolution of Loser, Joe Grah has reformed his Dallas band Jibe and released several solo singles and videos. Charles Lee Salvaggio later went on to play bass in Filter, and guitar in Gemini Syndrome and also teamed with Joe Grah on the project I Am The Wolf. Andra is now the drummer of bands Julien-K and Dead by Sunrise. Glendon Crain went on to join Godhead and later Hollywood Undead.

In spite of Loser's album Just Like You being completed, Island Records decided not to commercially release the album. However, a limited number of promotional copies had been sent to radio stations and music critics. These rare physical copies of the album have become sought-after collectors items among fans. The official Loser Myspace page has tracks from Just for You available for download.

Discography

Band members
Joe Grahlead vocals, songwriter
John5guitar, songwriter
Charles Lee Salvaggiobass
Glendon Craindrums
Bob Marletteproducer, engineer, mixer, songwriter

References

External links 

Musical groups established in 2004
Alternative rock groups from Texas